The Abysmal Richness of the Infinite Proximity of the Same is an album by keyboardist Anthony Coleman's Selfhaters which was released on the Tzadik label in 1998.

Reception

In her review for Allmusic, Joslyn Layne notes that "The follow-up release to Anthony Coleman's Selfhaters, The Abysmal Richness of the Infinite Proximity of the Same finds the Selfhaters Orchestra realizing a music that yields a different experience with each listen... This release is less accessible than the first album (which was mostly live recordings), but is still rewarding".

Track listing
All compositions by Anthony Coleman except as indicated
 "The Abysmal Richness of the Infinite Proximity of the Same: Objectives 1-8" (Anthony Coleman, The Selfhaters) - 22:04   
 "His Masquerade" - 5:08  
 "Fifty-Seven Something" - 12:30

Personnel
Anthony Coleman - piano, organ, trombone, voice 
Doug Wieselman - E-flat clarinet, bass harmonica 
Michaël Attias - alto saxophone, baritone saxophone 
Fred Lonberg-Holm - cello
Jim Pugliese - percussion

References

Tzadik Records albums
Anthony Coleman albums
1998 albums